Igor Vladimirovich Zagoruiko is a Kazakhstan water polo player. He was a member of the Kazakhstan men's national water polo team, playing as a driver. He was a part of the  team at the 2000 Summer Olympics and 2004 Summer Olympics. On club level he played for Sintez Kazan in Russia.

References

1971 births
Living people
Kazakhstani male water polo players
Water polo players at the 2000 Summer Olympics
Water polo players at the 2004 Summer Olympics
Olympic water polo players of Kazakhstan
People from Kentau
Water polo players at the 1994 Asian Games
Water polo players at the 1998 Asian Games
Asian Games medalists in water polo
Asian Games gold medalists for Kazakhstan
Medalists at the 1994 Asian Games
Medalists at the 1998 Asian Games
Kazakhstani expatriate sportspeople in Russia
20th-century Kazakhstani people